Khamosh Pani (Punjabi:  (Shahmukhi), ਖ਼ਾਮੋਸ਼ ਪਾਨੀ (Gurmukhi); Silent Waters) is a 2003 Indo-Pakistani film about a widowed mother and her young son living in a Punjabi village as it undergoes radical changes during the late 1970s.

Shot in a Pakistani village, the film was also released in India. It won seven awards, including Golden Leopard (Best Film), Best Actress, and Best Direction at the 56th Locarno International Film Festival, Switzerland.

Plot
In 1979 in Charkhi, a village in the Punjab province of Pakistan, Ayesha (a middle-aged widow) lives with her son Saleem, a teenager in love with schoolgirl Zubeida. Ayesha supports herself and Saleem with her late husband's pension and by giving lessons in the Qur'an to village girls. She refuses to go to the village well, and her neighbor's daughters draw water for her. Villagers like Amin, the postman, are troubled by the recent hanging of former prime minister Zulfikar Ali Bhutto by Zia-ul-Haq, the new military ruler who has promised to enforce Islamic law and encourages Islamic missionary and political groups. Two Islamic activists come to the village and, supported by the village choudhury, spread their message of Islamic zealotry and gain recruits to fight the Soviet invasion of Afghanistan. The older men in the village are disdainful of their intolerance and puritanism, cynical about Zia's postponement of elections and angry when the activists accuse them of being traitors. The activists gain a following amongst the village youth, including Saleem. They cajole and intimidate Saleem into attending a political meeting in Rawalpindi, where the speakers exhort the audience to commit themselves to jihad for the creation of an Islamic Pakistani state. Attracted by their zeal and call to serve Islam and Pakistan, Saleem (who wants to be more than a village farmer) breaks up with Zubeida and becomes estranged from his mother. Ayesha unsuccessfully tries to discourage him from following the Islamists. Saleem helps build a wall around the girls' school to "protect" them and enforces the closing of village shops during namaaz in line with Zia-ul-Haq's Islamisation, and Ayesha and Zubeida are alarmed by his transformation.

After an agreement between the Indian and Pakistani governments, a group of Sikh pilgrims from India, arrives in Pakistan to visit Sikh shrines. They come to Charkhi, the village they were forced to flee during the bloody partition of India in 1947. A pilgrim wants to look for his sister, who he believes survived the violence. The visitors have a mixed reception: a warm welcome from the village barber and hostility from the growing number of young Muslim zealots. Saleem is embarrassed that his mother sent food to the pilgrims and teaches the village girls that non-Muslims can go to heaven. The pilgrim asks some villagers, including Amin, if they knew if a Sikh woman survived the riots. They say they do not know, but Amin later visits the pilgrim's hut and tells him to look for the woman who never goes to the well. Following the girls who bring water to her house, the pilgrim finds Ayesha. When he asks her if she knows a Sikh woman who survived the riots, she anxiously tells him to leave. Saleem sees the pilgrim talking to his mother, and hears him call her "Veero" and tell her that her father wanted to see her before he died. Saleem is shocked to learn that Ayesha was Veero, a Sikh; in a flashback, she was amongst a group of village Sikh women lined up to jump into the village well rather than be raped by a Muslim mob in 1947. The Sikh men (including her father) want her to jump, but Veero runs away and is later caught, raped and imprisoned. Her rapist, remorseful, offers to marry her and she begins life as a Muslim.

Saleem reports this to his friends, who demand that Ayesha make a public declaration of her Islamic faith; she refuses and is shunned by the villagers, including her best friends. For the first time in over thirty years, she must fetch her own water. Ayesha meets her Sikh brother at the well but refuses to accompany him, condemning her father for encouraging her to commit suicide and asking how he would feel knowing that she was living as a Muslim. Her isolation increases, with only Zubeida keeping in touch with her. Realizing that she cannot escape her past, Ayesha jumps into the well. Saleem buries her, gathers her papers and belongings and throws them into the river.

In 2002 in Rawalpindi, Zubeida remembers Ayesha. In the street she sees a bearded Saleem, secretary-general of an Islamist organisation, answering questions about the compatibility of Islamic law with democracy.

Cast
 Kirron Kher as Ayesha
 Aamir Ali Malik as Saleem
 Arshad Mehmood as Mehboob
 Salman Shahid as Amin
 Shilpa Shukla as Zubeida
 Sarfaraz Ansari as Rashid
 Abid Ali as Chaudhary
 Adnan Shah as Mazhar
 Khursheed Shahid as Singer 
 Fareeha Jabeen as Shabnam
 Shazim Ashraf as Zubair
 Rehan Sheikh as Afshan
 Barkat Ullah as Mubarak Bhai
 Nisar Qadri as Haji Munnavar
 Saba Malik as Courtesan
 Madan Gopal Singh as Sikh Pilgram
 Gurjot Singh Mann as Sikh Pilgram
 Suhair Fariha Khan as Veero

Production 
The role of Ayesha Khan was earlier offered to veteran Pakistani actress Bushra Ansari who rejected it due to her personal reasons.

Awards
 2003: Won Top Prize at Locarno International Film Festival
 Best Actress: Kirron Kher
 Don Quixote Award - Special Mention: Sabiha Sumar
 Golden Leopard (Best Film): Sabiha Sumar
 Prize of the Ecumenical Jury: Sabiha Sumar
 Youth Jury Award - Special Mention: Sabiha Sumar
 2003: Nantes Three Continents Festival
 Audience Award: Sabiha Sumar
 Silver Montgolfiere: Sabiha Sumar
 2003: Karachi International Film Festival
 Special Jurors' Selection Ciepie
 Best Actress in a Leading Role: Kirron Kher
 Best Screenplay: Paromita Vohra
 2005: Lux Style Awards
 Best Film

See also
 List of Asian historical drama films

References

External links
 

2003 films
Golden Leopard winners
Films about suicide
Films set in Punjab, Pakistan
India–Pakistan relations in popular culture
Films set in the partition of India
Punjabi-language Indian films
Punjabi-language Pakistani films
2000s Punjabi-language films
Films about Sikhism
Films about Islam